Aleksandr Vitalyevich Minkov (born 7 June 1957), better known by his stage name Alexander Marshal, is a Russian singer, songwriter, and musician; Honored Artist of the Russian Federation (2007).

Minkov was born in Korenovsk, USSR He is known for his solo career, and as well as past participation in several bands: Araks, Tsvety, Zdravstvuy, pesnya, Gorky Park. Marshal was awarded Golden Gramophone Award in 2001 and 2003, and is also a laureate of Russian musical awards like  Chanson of the Year and Pesnya goda.

His stage name, "Marshal", is in fact his nickname since school years, because, being very tall, he always stood first in ranks during roll call, both in sports and in military school.

Discography 
Albums
 1995 —  From Shore to Shore 
 1998 — Maybe
 2000 — Where I Was  Not
 2000 — Highlander
 2001 — Special
 2001 — White Ash
 2002 — Best Songs
 2002 — Batya
 2003 — Father Arseny
 2005 — Cranes are Flying
 2006 — Or So
 2006 — Life on Loan (Live)
 2007 — Sailboat
 2008 — Where the Sun Sleeps with Vyacheslav Bykov
 2009 — Goodbye, Regiment
 2012 — Before Sunrise the Night Stars with Vyacheslav Bykov
 2012 — Wrap
 2016 — Shadow

References

External links

 Official website 
 Народный сайт Александра Маршала
 Александр Маршал: «Произведения великого человека должны быть всеобщим достоянием»
 Александр МАРШАЛ: Мне всегда сопутствует удача
  Название «Парк Горького» родилось совершенно спонтанно
 Александр Маршал: «Произведения великого человека должны быть всеобщим достоянием»
 Певцу Александру Маршалу зрители в Серове аплодировали стоя

1957 births
Soviet male singers
20th-century Russian male singers
20th-century Russian singers
21st-century Russian singers
Russian bass guitarists
Male bass guitarists
Russian rock singers
Russian rock musicians
Living people
Honored Artists of the Russian Federation
Russian television presenters
Gorky Park (band)
Pseudonymous artists
Russian chanson
Winners of the Golden Gramophone Award
People from Korenovsky District